Jorge Raúl Bravo Orona (born 28 November 1967 in Trinidad, Uruguay) is a Uruguayan cyclist.

Major results

1995
 1st Stage 1b (TTT) Vuelta del Uruguay
2002
 2nd Overall Rutas de América
2003
 6th Overall Vuelta del Uruguay
1st Stage 9
2004
 7th Overall Vuelta del Uruguay
2005
 8th Overall Vuelta del Uruguay
2007
 1st Overall Vuelta del Uruguay
1st Stage 6b
 2nd Overall Rutas de América
 8th Overall Volta de Ciclismo Internacional do Estado de São Paulo
2008
 6th Road race, Pan American Road Championships
2009
 1st Stage 6 Rutas de América
2010
 2nd Road race, National Road Championships
 6th Overall Rutas de América
 6th Overall Vuelta del Uruguay
2011
 3rd Overall Rutas de América
2014
 1st Stage 2b (TTT) Vuelta del Uruguay
2015
 3rd Time trial, National Road Championships
2016
 7th Overall Volta Ciclística Internacional do Rio Grande do Sul
 9th Overall Vuelta del Uruguay
1st Stage 3a (TTT)

References

External links

1967 births
Living people
Uruguayan male cyclists